Blåhaj (stylized BLÅHAJ, ; colloquially anglicised as ,  or ) is a plush toy manufactured and sold by the Swedish company IKEA. Modeled after a blue shark and made of recycled polyester, the toy has gained prominence on social media as a popular internet meme, especially in the transgender community, and has also been used as a mascot by IKEA in some regions.

Physical properties
It can be machine-washed at 40°C (104°F).

Production and distribution

In September 2021, Twitter accounts representing IKEA in Ireland and in Singapore, in response to customers enquiring about the toy, claimed that Blåhaj would be discontinued in April 2022. Sources later confirmed that it had been out of stock or delisted from IKEA's stores in China, Taiwan, and Singapore. However, IKEA's USA Twitter account later stated that the toy would remain available for sale in the United States. Later, IKEA's Media Relations team clarified that the plush would not be discontinued, but online shop and internal store listings in several countries were simply reflecting a supply chain issue. In early 2022, new Blåhaj plushes were found to have been made in Indonesia, indicating that they had switched suppliers during that period.

In culture

In 2018, Blåhaj grew to prominence as an internet meme, with social media users posting humorous photos of it in their homes. Around this time, Blåhaj began to be associated with LGBT and particularly transgender individuals, in part due to being colored similarly to the transgender flag. IKEA was seen as acknowledging this phenomenon (despite not openly declaring such) when the company ran a series of ads in support of the 2021 Swiss same-sex marriage referendum featuring the toy. Due to this association, Blåhaj has become commonly regarded as a symbol of the online transgender community. 

The toy has continued to inspire memes and social media posts on Instagram, Twitter, Reddit, and TikTok, and is a popular product in numerous territories. Blåhaj also made a brief appearance in the Marvel Studios-produced television series Hawkeye.

In response to the announcement that the sale of Blåhaj would be discontinued in certain regions, the term "Blåhaj" trended as a topic on social media for several days as fans of the toy claimed it was becoming "extinct". Similarly, the toy was also displayed at some IKEA stores in Hong Kong to demonstrate the functionality of vacuum bags in a store display, which elicited a similar social media response.

In response to the toy's popularity, IKEA has produced a line of Blåhaj shopping bags which are sold at its stores in some regions, including Taiwan and Malaysia. IKEA has also used Blåhaj in marketing material; IKEA Japan used the toy as a mascot in a marketing campaign for tiny apartments sold by IKEA in the region. In the campaign, a Blåhaj plays a real estate agent who envisions a tiny apartment. IKEA of Malaysia and Taiwan sold red-bean and sesame filled buns resembling Blåhaj. IKEA Hong Kong featured Blåhaj as part of an advertising campaign for its Tsim Sha Tsui branch, punning the location as "Tsim Shark Tsui".

In November 2022, IKEA Canada hosted a giveaway offering transgender individuals a special edition Blåhaj in the colors of the transgender pride flag, and with their name embroidered on their fin. One of these was gifted to a sexual health centre in Halifax, Nova Scotia.

References

External links 

 IKEA Blåhaj Shark entry on Know Your Meme

2010s toys
Fictional sharks
IKEA products
Internet memes introduced in 2018
Stuffed toys
Toy animals
Transgender culture